A shower is a place in which a person bathes under a spray of typically warm or hot water.

Shower or showers may also refer to:

 Shower (precipitation), an abrupt and rapid fall of rain or snow

Arts, entertainment, and media
 Shower (film), a 1999 Chinese comedy drama
 The Shower (film), a 1992 Canadian comedy-drama film
 "Shower" (song), by Becky G, 2014
 "Rain Shower" or "Shower" ("Sonagi"), a 1959 Korean short story, and 1979 film 
 "The Shower", an episode of The O.C. (season 1)

People
 Shower (surname), including a list of people with the name
 Showers (surname), including a list of people with the name

Other uses
 Mount Showers, a mountain in Antarctica
 Shower (juggling), a juggling pattern
 Showers-Aero, an American aerospace design firm
 Warm Showers, an international hospitality exchange plattform for cyclists

See also

 April Showers (disambiguation)
 Baby shower, an event at which new or expecting parents receive gifts
 Bridal shower, an event at which an impending bride receives gifts
 Meteor shower, an event at which several meteors radiate from one point
 Particle shower, a cascade of subatomic particles